Igor Fedorovich Yemchuk (2 December 1930 – 5 March 2008) was a Ukrainian rower who competed for the Soviet Union in the 1952 Summer Olympics and in the 1956 Summer Olympics. In 1952 he won the silver medal with his partner Heorhiy Zhylin in the double sculls event. Four years later he was a crew member of the Soviet boat which won the bronze medal in the coxed pairs competition.

References 

Profile of Ihor Yemchuk

External links
 
 

1930 births
2008 deaths
Sportspeople from Kyiv
Ukrainian male rowers
Soviet male rowers
Olympic rowers of the Soviet Union
Rowers at the 1952 Summer Olympics
Rowers at the 1956 Summer Olympics
Olympic silver medalists for the Soviet Union
Olympic bronze medalists for the Soviet Union
Olympic medalists in rowing
Medalists at the 1956 Summer Olympics
Medalists at the 1952 Summer Olympics
European Rowing Championships medalists
National University of Ukraine on Physical Education and Sport alumni